The Mexican Secretary of the Navy (SEMAR) is a member of the federal executive cabinet as well as the highest-ranking Mexican naval officer  with the responsibility of commanding the Mexican Navy (including the Mexican Naval Infantry or ‘marines,’ as well as the Mexican merchant marine service ) and managing the Secretariat of the Navy (the naval ministry and naval civil service). The secretary is appointed by the President of the Republic.

Organizes, administers and prepares the Navy.
Exercising sovereignty in territorial seas, its air space and Mexico's coasts.

Functions
Based on article 30 of the Organic Law of the Federal Public Administration, among other actions the Secretariat is mandated to:

 Organize and administer the affairs of the Mexican Navy
 Manage the assets and reserves of the Navy in all its aspects
 Grant licenses and withdrawals, and intervene in the pensions of Navy service personnel
 Exercise sovereignty in territorial waters, as well as monitoring the coast of the territory, waterways, national islands and the exclusive economic zone
 Organize, administer and operate the naval aviation service
 Conduct naval public education
 Organize and administer the maritime police service
 Inspect the services of the Navy
 Build, rebuild and conserve the port works required by the Navy
 Establish and manage the stores and fuel stations and lubricants of the Navy
 Execute the topohydrographic works of the coasts, islands, ports and waterways, as well as organize the maritime chart file and relative statistics
 Intervene in the granting of permits for expeditions or scientific explorations abroad or international in national waters
 Build, maintain and operate, shipyards, dams, boatyards and naval establishments destined to the ships of the Mexican Navy
 Organize and provide naval health services
 Integrate the national oceanographic information archive
 Help in the organization and enforcement of National Naval Military Service
 Organize Maritime SAR operations
 Administer the Mexican Merchant Marine Fleets

List of secretaries

References

External links 
Official Website of the Navy
Official site of the President's Cabinet

N
Mexican Navy
Mexico
Navy